"Mary" is a song by American rock band Scissor Sisters, included on their eponymous debut album as the fourth track. Lead singer Jake Shears wrote "Mary" for his best friend, Mary Hanlon, who later died in April 2006 from a brain aneurysm.

"Mary" was released as a single in the United Kingdom on October 11, 2004, across three formats: a 12-inch picture disc, a regular 12-inch vinyl disc, and a CD single. The song peaking at number 14 on the UK Singles Chart and number 32 on the Irish Singles Chart.

Music video
The video for the single was released in October 2004 and was considered a curio by fans. It was seen as a spoof of Rapunzel and other children's fairy tales. The music video was produced by Don Bluth. Scissor Sisters contacted him after recalling fond memories of an animated sequence in Xanadu. The video also includes a live-action portion, showing a woman getting out of bed, boarding a London Underground train, departing at Canary Wharf tube station and entering and working in a Docklands office. This sequence segues into the animation with her staring into a photocopier, presumably indicating the animated sequence is her daydream.

Track listings
UK 12-inch picture disc 
A. "Mary" – 4:45
B. "Laura" (City Hi-Fi remix) – 4:20

UK 12-inch vinyl 
A. "Mary" – 4:45
B. "Mary" (Junkie XL mix) – 8:46

UK CD single 
 "Mary" – 4:45
 "Mary" (Junkie XL radio edit) – 3:55
 "Take Me Out" (Jo Whiley Session) – 4:32

Charts

Release history

References

External links
 Official website
 Underground Illusion - The Ultimate Scissor Sisters Database

2000s ballads
2004 singles
2004 songs
EMI Records singles
Music videos directed by Julien Temple
Polydor Records singles
Rock ballads
Scissor Sisters songs
Songs written by Babydaddy
Songs written by Jake Shears